Asteromyia is a genus of gall midges in the family Cecidomyiidae. There are about nine described species in Asteromyia.

Species
These nine species belong to the genus Asteromyia:
 Asteromyia carbonifera (Osten Sacken, 1862)
 Asteromyia chrysothamni Felt, 1918
 Asteromyia clarkei (Felt, 1909)
 Asteromyia euthamiae Gagne, 1968
 Asteromyia gutierreziae Felt, 1916
 Asteromyia laeviana (Felt, 1907)
 Asteromyia modesta (Felt, 1907)
 Asteromyia tumifica (Beutenmuller, 1907)
 Asteromyia urostigmatis (Tavares, 1917)

References

Further reading

External links

Cecidomyiinae
Articles created by Qbugbot
Cecidomyiidae genera